The 1970 Utah Redskins football team was an American football team that represented the University of Utah as a member of the Western Athletic Conference (WAC) during the 1970 NCAA University Division football season. In their third season under head coach Bill Meek, the Redskins compiled an overall record of 6–4 with a mark of 4–2 against conference opponents, placing third in the WAC. Home games were played on campus at Ute Stadium in Salt Lake City.

Schedule

Roster

After the season

NFL Draft
Three Utah players were selected in the 1971 NFL draft.

References

Utah
Utah Utes football seasons
Utah Redskins football